This is a list of cheeses from, or connected with, the Netherlands.

Dutch cheeses

 Beemster – a hard cow's milk cheese, traditionally from cows grazed on sea-clay soil in polders. 
 Boerenkaas – "farmhouse cheese", prepared using raw unpasteurised milk 
 Edam - a red-waxed semi-hard  cows' milk cheese named after the town of Edam
 Graskaas - "grass cheese", a seasonal cows' milk cheese made from the first milkings after the cows are let into the pastures in spring. 
 Gouda - a semi-hard cows' milk cheese traditionally traded in Gouda, now often used as a worldwide generic term for Dutch-style cheese. 
 Kanterkaas - "edge cheese", a hard cheese produced in Friesland, with variants flavoured with cumin and cloves. 
 Leerdammer – a trademarked Emmental-style semi-firm cows' milk cheese
 Leyden - a cows' milk cheese flavoured with cumin and caraway seed
 Limburger - a soft cheese with a distinctive smell, traditionally from the area of the former Duchy of Limburg
 Maaslander - a trademarked Gouda-style cheese made in Huizen
 Maasdam - an Emmental-style semi-firm cows' milk cheese
 Nagelkaas - "clove cheese", flavoured cows' milk cheese from Friesland. 
 Old Amsterdam – a hard cows' milk cheese
 Parrano – a trademarked Gouda-style semi-firm cheese
 Prima Donna - a similar style of cheese trademarked by a different company. 
 Roomano - an aged, hard cheese with a lower butterfat percentage than other Gouda-style cheeses
 Vlaskaas – "flax cheese",  a firm, yet creamy texture and a sweet, sharp flavor

See also

 List of cheeses

References

Cow's-milk cheeses
Dutch